The term shareholder yield captures the three ways in which the management of a public company can distribute cash to shareholders: cash dividends, stock repurchases and debt reduction.

Overview
Dividends are the most obvious form of distributing cash. Stock repurchases also increase shareholder value provided that the shares purchased are cancelled or held in treasury but not used as a device to make up for dilution from option issuances to management and others. Reducing debt can also produce a de facto dividend; assuming the value of the firm remains the same, shareholder value is increased as debt is reduced.

To understand how debt reduction increases shareholder value, it is helpful to consider the 1958 paper by Nobel laureates Franco Modigliani and Merton H. Miller entitled The Cost of Capital, Corporation Finance and the Theory of Investment. This paper proved that a firm’s value is independent of how it is financed, provided that one ignores the tax effect of debt interest. If Modigliani and Miller are correct, the use of free cash flow to repay debt results in a transfer of wealth from the debtor to the shareholder.

History of term
The term shareholder yield was coined by William W. Priest of Epoch Investment Partners in a paper in 2005 entitled The Case for Shareholder Yield as a Dominant Driver of Future Equity Returns as a way to look more holistically at how companies allocate and distribute cash rather than considering dividends in isolation. This concept was further detailed in the 2007 book, Free Cash Flow and Shareholder Yield: New Priorities for the Global Investor, by William W. Priest and Lindsay H. McClelland.

References

Stock market
Yield